This is a list of deities playing a role in the Classic (200–1000 CE), Post-Classic (1000–1539 CE) and Contact Period (1511–1697) of Maya religion. The names are mainly taken from the books of Chilam Balam, Lacandon ethnography, the Madrid Codex, the work of Diego de Landa, and the Popol Vuh.  Depending on the source, most names are either Yucatec or Kʼicheʼ.  The Classic Period names (belonging to the Classic Maya language) are only rarely known with certainty.

Maya mythological beings

List Source keys 
CHB – Books of Chilam Balam
LAC – Lacandon ethnography
L – de Landa
M — Madrid Codex
PV – the Popol Vuh.

A

Acan 
The god of wine and intoxication, identified with the drink Balché.

Acat 
A god of tattoos and tattooing.

Alom
The god of the sky and wood, a creator deity.

Ah-Muzen-Cab
God of bees and honey.

Awilix 
The goddess of the moon, queen of the night.

B

Bacab
The old god of the interior of the earth and of thunder, sky-carrier, fourfold.

Baalham
The jaguar god of the underworld. Also any of a group of jaguar gods who protected people and communities.

Bitol pv*
A sky god. One of the creator and destroyer deities who participated in the last two attempts at creating humanity.

Bolon Tzʼakab (Dzacab) *L* [ god K ]
Ah Bolon Dzacab "Innumerable Generations", the lightning god, patron of the harvest and the seeds.

Bolontiku *CHB*
A group of nine underworld gods.

Bolon Yokteʼ
"Nine Strides", mentioned in the Books of Chilam Balam and in Classic inscriptions; functions unknown.

Buluc Chabtan [ god F ]
The god of war, violence, sacrifice and gambling.

C

Cabrakan
A god of mountains and earthquakes. He was a son of Vucub Caquix and Chimalmat.

Cacoch *LAC*
A creator

Camazotz *PV*
A bat and death god.

Can Tzicnal *L*
The Bacab of the north, associated with the color white, and the Muluc years. Son of Itzamna and Ixchel.

Chaac *L*
The god of rain, thunder, and lightning, wields an axe of lightning, brother to Kinich Ahau.

Chaac Uayab Xoc *L*
A fish god and the patron deity of fishermen.

Chiccan
A group of four Chorti rain gods who live in lakes and make rain clouds from the water in them. As with the Bacabs, each of the rain gods was associated with a cardinal direction. Chiccan was also the name of a day in the Tzolkin cycle of the calendar.

Cit-Bolon-Tum
A god of medicine and healing

Chimalmat 
A giant who was, by Vucub Caquix, the mother of Cabrakan and Zipacna.

Chin
The main god of homosexual relationships.

Cizin 
A god of earthquakes and death who lived in Metnal. He is often depicted as a dancing human skeleton smoking a cigarette.

Colel Cab
Goddess of the bees.

Colop U Uichkin *RITUAL OF THE BACABS*
An eclipse deity.

Coyopa
The god of thunder. Brother of Cakulha.

E

Ek Chuaj *M* (God M)
Ek Chuaj, the "black war chief" was the patron god of warriors and merchants. He was depicted carrying a bag over his shoulder. In art, he was a dark-skinned man with circles around his eyes, a scorpion tail and dangling lower lip.

G

GI, GII, GIII
The three patron deities of the Palenque kingdom, made up of a sea deity with a shell ear, GII a baby lightning god (god K), and GIII the jaguar god of fire, also patron of the number seven.

Gukumatz > Qʼuqʼumatz *PV*
A feathered snake god and creator. The depiction of the feathered serpent deity is present in other cultures of Mesoamerica. Gukumatz of the Kʼicheʼ Maya is closely related to the god Kukulkan of Yucatán and to Quetzalcoatl of the Aztec. God of the seas, oceans, wind, and storms.

H

Hachäkʼyum *LAC*
Patron deity of the Lacandon.

Hobnil *L*
Bacab of the east.

Hozanek *L*
Bacab of the south.

Hum Hau
A god of death and the underworld.

Hun-Batz *PV*
"One Howler Monkey", one of two stepbrothers of the Hero Twins, one of the Howler Monkey Gods and patron of the arts.

Hun-Came *PV*
"One-Death", a lord of the underworld (Xibalba) who, along with Vucub-Came "Seven-Death", killed Hun Hunahpu. They were defeated by the latter's sons the Hero Twins.

Hun-Chowen *PV*
One of the two stepbrothers of the Hero Twins, one of the Howler Monkey Gods and patron of the arts.

Hun-Hunahpu *PV*
The father of the Maya Hero Twins Ixbalanque and Hun-Ahpu by a virgin. Beheaded in Xibalba, the underworld, by the rulers of Xibalba, Hun Came and Vucub Came.

Hunab Ku
"Sole God", identical with Itzamna as the highest Yucatec god; or a more abstract upper god. *Current research now indicates this 'Maya' symbol is not of Maya origin and rather an invention by a Catholic missionary to more easily introduce one-god concept into the Maya culture.

Hun-Ahpu *PV*
One of the Maya Hero Twins.

Hunahpu-Gutch *PV*
One of the thirteen creator gods who helped create humanity.

Hunahpu Utiu *PV*
One of the thirteen creator gods who helped to create humanity.

Hun-Ixim
"One-Maize", a reading of the name glyph of the Classic Period Tonsured Maize God

Hun-nal-ye
A now-obsolete reading of the name glyph of the Classic Period Tonsured Maize God

Hunraqan *PV*
"One-Leg", one of three lightning gods together called "Heart of the Sky", and acting as world creators. God of the weather, wind, storms, and fire.

I
Itzamna
The founder of maize and cacao, as well as writing, calendars, and medicine. Once mentioned as the father of the Bacabs. 
Itzananohkʼu
A patron god of the Lacandon people.
Ixbalanque > Xbalanque
Ixchel *L* [goddess O]
Jaguar goddess of midwifery and medicine.
Ixmucane *PV*
One of the thirteen creator gods who helped create humanity, grandmother of the Hero Twins. 
Ixpiyacoc *PV*
A creator god who helped create humanity. 
Ixtab *L*
Goddess of suicide, represented with a rope around her neck.

J

Jacawitz *PV*
mountain god of the Postclassic Kʼicheʼ Maya

K

Kʼawiil (Kawil, Kauil)
Assumed to have been the Classic name of God K (Bolon Dzacab). Title attested for Itzamna, Uaxac Yol, and Amaite Ku; family name; probably not meaning "food", but "powerful".

K'inich Ahau
The solar deity.

Kisin (Cisin)
The most commonly depicted god of death.

Kukulkan
"Feathered Serpent". Although heavily Mexicanised, Kukulkan has his origins among the Maya of the Classic Period, when he was known as Waxaklahun Ubah Kan (/waʃaklaˈχuːn uːˈɓaχ kän/), the War Serpent, and he has been identified as the Postclassic version of the Vision Serpent of Classic Maya art.

M

Mam
A title of respect meaning "Grandfather" and applied to a number of different Maya deities including earth spirits, mountain spirits, and the four Bacabs.

Maximon
A god of travelers, merchants, medicine men/women, mischief and fertility, later conflated with Saint Simon and in modern times part of the celebrations surrounding Holy Week.

N

Nakon
The god of war. 
A Powerful god, claimed to be stronger than all the other gods of war in every other religion.

Nohochacyum
A creator-destroyer deity, the brother of the death god Kisin (or possibly another earthquake god also known as Kisin). He is the sworn enemy of the world serpent Hapikern and it is said that, in the end of days, he will destroy Hapikern by wrapping him around himself to smother him. In some versions, this will destroy life on Earth. He is related, in some stories, to Usukan, Uyitzin, Yantho and Hapikern, all of whom wish ill to human beings. Brother of Xamaniqinqu, the patron god of travelers and merchants.

Q

Qaholom *PV*
One of the second set of creator gods.

Qʼuqʼumatz *PV*
Feathered Snake god and creator. The depiction of the feathered serpent deity is present in other cultures of Mesoamerica. Qʼuqʼumatz of the Kʼicheʼ Maya is closely related to the god Kukulkan of Yucatán and to Quetzalcoatl of the Aztecs.

S

Sip
A hunting god of the Yucatec Maya arguably corresponding, in the Classic period, to an elderly human with deer ears and antlers.

T

Tepeu *PV*
A sky god and one of the creator deities who participated in all three attempts at creating humanity.

Tohil *PV*
A patron god of the Kʼicheʼ, to whom a great temple was erected at the Kʼicheʼ capital Qʼumarkaj.

Tunkuruchu *PV*
An ancient owl, one who foretells death. At a party held by all birds, he was humiliated by some humans, and as revenge, he would visit them announcing their deaths.

V

Vatanchu
"Straight God", a mountain god of the Postclassic Manche Chʼol.

Votan
Legendary ancestral deity, Chiapas.

Vucub-Caquix *PV*
A bird being, whose wife is Chimalmat and whose sons are the demonic giants Cabrakan and Zipacna.

X

Xaman Ek
The god of travelers and merchants, who gave offerings to him on the side of roads while traveling.

Xbalanque *PV* [god CH]
One of the Hero or War Twins and companion to Hunahpu.

Xcarruchan
A mountain god of the Postclassic Manche Chʼol.

Xmucane and Xpiayoc *PV*
A creator god couple which helped create the first humans. They are also the parents of Hun Hunahpu and Vucub Hunahpu. They were called Grandmother of Day, Grandmother of Light and Bearer twice over, begetter twice over and given the titles midwife and matchmaker.

Xquic
She was the daughter of Cuchumaquic, one of the lords of the underworld, Xibalba. She is noted for being the mother of the Hero Twins, Hunahpu and Xbalanque and is sometimes considered to be the Maya goddess associated with the waning moon.

Y

Yaluk
One of four Mopan "Grandfathers" of the earth and chief lightning god.

Yopaat
An important rain god at Copán and Quiriguá in the southern Maya area.

Yum Kaax
God of the woods, of wild nature, and of the hunt; invoked before carving out a maize field from the wilderness.

Z

Zac Cimi *L*
The Bacab of the west.

Zipacna *PV*
A demonic personification of the earth crust.

See also
Maya death gods

Notes

References
 
 Knowlton, Timothy W., Maya Creation Myths: Words and Worlds of the Chilam Balam. University Press of Colorado, Boulder 2010.
 Taube, Karl, The Major Gods of Ancient Yucatán. Dumbarton Oaks, Washington 1992.
 Mark, Joshua (2012). "The Mayan Pantheon: The Many Gods of the Maya". worldhistory.org.
 
 Thompson, J. Eric S. Maya History and Religion. University of Oklahoma Press, Norman 1970.
 
 

Maya gods
Maya goddesses
Mesoamerican deities
Maya gods and supernatural beings
Maya gods and supernatural beings